Sotto una pioggia di parole (en: Under a Rain of Words) is the third studio album by Italian Pop duo Zero Assoluto. The album was released in June 2009, in Italy. It was certified gold by the Federation of the Italian Music Industry, for domestic sales exceeding 30,000 units.

Singles
 The debut single is Per dimenticare, released in May 2009. The single subsequently became a commercial and broadcast success in Italy.

Track list 
 "Sotto una pioggia di parole" – 3:21
 "Grazie" – 2:52
 "Volano i pensieri" – 3:40
 "Per dimenticare" – 3:34
 "Ripensandoci" – 3:21
 "L'infinito è dietro di lei" – 3:00
 "Roma (che non sorridi quasi mai)" – 4:06
 "Cos'è normale" – 3:22
 "Non guardarmi così" 
 "Come la fortuna"

References

2009 albums
Zero Assoluto albums
Italian-language albums